Elektrozavodskaya is a station on the Bolshaya Koltsevaya line of the Moscow Metro. The station was opened on 31 December 2020 as a one-station extension from Lefortovo and provisionally functions as part of Nekrasovskaya line. The station serves as a transfer point to the Arbatsko-Pokrovskaya line.

Name
During planning, the station was named Elektrozavodskaya; then in June 2015, it was officially renamed Rubtsovskaya. The name comes from the Rubtsovskaya Bank of the Yauza River. In November 2019, the station was renamed back to Elektrozavodskaya.

Gallery

References

Moscow Metro stations
Railway stations opened in 2020
Bolshaya Koltsevaya line